Saved search is a search query in search engine technology that is saved for future reuse:

 Prospective search, searching a changing corpus for new search results
 Virtual folders, an organizing principle in file management where folders represent search result sets 
 View (database), a virtual relational table which is defined as a database query
 A feature of Web search engines that saves queries for reuse